Pilar Guerrero Rubio (born 2 May 1984) is a Mexican politician from the Ecologist Green Party of Mexico. From 2006 to 2009 she served as Deputy of the LX Legislature of the Mexican Congress representing the State of Mexico.

References

1984 births
Living people
Politicians from the State of Mexico
Women members of the Chamber of Deputies (Mexico)
Ecologist Green Party of Mexico politicians
21st-century Mexican politicians
21st-century Mexican women politicians
Deputies of the LX Legislature of Mexico
Members of the Chamber of Deputies (Mexico) for the State of Mexico